Pat West (February 21, 1923 – February 7, 1996) was a former fullback in the National Football League. He was drafted in the 28th round of the 1945 NFL Draft by the Cleveland Rams and would play with the team for three seasons and part of another, including during the franchise's move to Los Angeles, California, before playing the last part of his career with the Green Bay Packers.

References

1923 births
1996 deaths
American football fullbacks
Canadian football fullbacks
Cleveland Rams players
Edmonton Elks players
Green Bay Packers players
Los Angeles Rams players
Players of American football from Pennsylvania
USC Trojans football players
Pittsburgh Panthers football players